Robert Kleberg is the name of:

Robert J. Kleberg (King Ranch) (1853–1932), Texas rancher
Robert J. Kleberg (1803–1888), German immigrant who fought in the Battle of San Jacinto